Equine estrogens, or horse estrogens, are estrogens found in horses. They include the following:

 Estradiol
 Estrone
 Equilin (Δ7-estrone)
 Equilenin (Δ6,8-estrone)
 17α-Dihydroequilin (Δ7-17α-estradiol)
 17β-Dihydroequilin (Δ7-17β-estradiol)
 17α-Dihydroequilenin (Δ6,8-17α-estradiol)
 17β-Dihydroequilenin (Δ6,8-17β-estradiol)
 8,9-Dehydroestrone (Δ8-estrone)
 8,9-Dehydroestradiol (Δ8-17β-estradiol)
 Hippulin (Δ8-14-isoestrone)

As well as their conjugates, such as estrone sulfate.

Equine estrogens are found in the human medications conjugated estrogens (Premarin) and esterified estrogens (Estratab, Menest).

See also
 List of estrogens § Equine estrogens

References

Estrogens